Up and Coming  is a studio album by guitarist John Abercrombie with pianist Marc Copland, bassist Drew Gress, and drummer Joey Baron that was recorded in 2016 and released in 2017 by ECM Records. The album contains eight tracks: seven originals by Abercrombie and Copland and a cover version of "Nardis" by Miles Davis.

Reception
At Metacritic, which assigns a normalized rating out of 100 to reviews from mainstream critics, the album received an average score of 80, based on four reviews, which indicates "generally favorable reviews".

Paul de Barros of DownBeat stated, "A solid follow-up to 2013's 39 Steps, the new album by the John Abercrombie Quartet— Marc Copland (piano), Drew Gress (bass) and Joey Baron (drums)—is another quiet, delicately balanced outing with an ebbing and flowing undercurrent that recalls the understated loveliness of Bill Evans and Jim Hall. As Abercrombie fans know, the guitarist has dialed back his trademark reverb in favor of a classic, single-note glow. However, listening to his quartet still feels pleasantly like taking a warm sonic bath."

John Fordham of The Guardian said, "The whole album is the quintessence of jazz power in reserve".

Track listing

Personnel
 John Abercrombie – guitar
 Marc Copland – piano
 Drew Gress – double bass
 Joey Baron – drums

Production
 Manfred Eicher – producer
 Thom Beemer – assistant
 Nate Odden – assistant
 James Farber – engineer

References

2013 albums
Albums produced by Manfred Eicher
ECM Records albums
John Abercrombie (guitarist) albums